The 1954 Delaware State Hornets football team represented Delaware State College—now known as Delaware State University—as a member of the Central Intercollegiate Athletic Association (CIAA) in the 1954 college football season. Led by coach Edward Jackson, the Hornets compiled a 7–1 record, just two seasons after posting a 1–7 record. They shut out their first four opponents, only allowing Lincoln, St. Paul's, and St. Augustine's to score any points. They maintained a perfect record until the final game of the season, losing 6–12 vs. St. Augustine's. The team had 40 members, a fifth of the entire 1954 enrollment at DSU.

Schedule

References

Further reading
 

Delaware State
Delaware State Hornets football seasons
Delaware State Hornets football